This is a list of countries by motor vehicle production in the 2010s based on Organisation Internationale des Constructeurs d'Automobiles (OICA).

Figures include passenger cars, light commercial vehicles, minibuses, trucks, buses and coaches.

2010

2011

2012

2013

2014

2015

2016

See also 
 List of countries by motor vehicle production in the 2000s
 List of countries by motor vehicle production
 List of manufacturers by motor vehicle production

2010s economic history